Uroseius is a genus of mites in the family Trachytidae.

Species
The genus comprises the following species:
 Uroseius acuminatus (C.L. Koch, 1847)     
 Uroseius australianus (Canestrini, 1884)     
 Uroseius baloghi Hirschmann, 1973     
 Uroseius botswanensis Fain, 1998     
 Uroseius brasiliensis Wisniewski & Hirschmann, 1993     
 Uroseius castrii Hirschmann, 1973     
 Uroseius chilensis Wisniewski & Hirschmann, 1992     
 Uroseius costaricensis Fain, 1998     
 Uroseius cylindricus (Berlese, 1916)     
 Uroseius degeneratus Oudemans, 1913     
 Uroseius disneyi Fain, 1998     
 Uroseius dubiosus (Vitzthum, 1925)     
 Uroseius elongatus (Kramer, 1876)     
 Uroseius gaieri (Schweizer, 1961)     
 Uroseius grootaerti Fain, 1998     
 Uroseius hirschmanni Hiramatsu, 1977     
 Uroseius hunzikeri Schweizer, 1922     
 Uroseius inaequipunctatus (Stoll, 1886)     
 Uroseius infirmus (Berlese, 1887)     
 Uroseius jabae Berlese, 1910     
 Uroseius koehleri Wisniewski, 1979     
 Uroseius lagenaeformis (Berlese, 1904)     
 Uroseius myrmecophilus Wisniewski, 1979     
 Uroseius naganoensis Hiramatsu, 1979     
 Uroseius ovatus Leonardi, 1897     
 Uroseius peraphorus (Krantz & Ainscough, 1960)     
 Uroseius philipsi Wisniewski & Hirschmann, 1993     
 Uroseius phoridarum Fain, 1998     
 Uroseius rhinebeckensis Wisniewski & Hirschmann, 1993     
 Uroseius roleri Masan, 2001     
 Uroseius rotundus Hiramatsu, 1981     
 Uroseius sorrentinus (Lombardini, 1952)     
 Uroseius traegardhi Hirschmann & Zirngiebl-Nicol, 1969     
 Uroseius trogicolis Masan, 1999     
 Uroseius tuberosus Hirschmann & Hiramatsu, 1977     
 Uroseius turki Hirschmann, 1979     
 Uroseius vitzthumi Hirschmann & Zirngiebl-Nicol, 1969     
 Uroseius willmanni (Hirschmann & Zirngiebl-Nicol, 1969)     
 Uroseius yoshidai Hiramatsu, 1982

References

Mesostigmata
Acari genera